Pennsylvania's second congressional district includes all of Northeast Philadelphia and parts of North Philadelphia east of Broad Street, as well as portions of Philadelphia's River Wards. It has been represented by Democrat Brendan Boyle since 2019.

The district is demographically diverse, with about 39% of residents identifying as white, nearly 27% of residents identifying as black, 26% identifying as Hispanic or Latino (of any race), and 8% identifying as Asian.

Prior to 2018, the district covered West Philadelphia, North Philadelphia, and Northwest Philadelphia, as well as parts of South Philadelphia, Center City, and western suburbs such as Lower Merion Township in Montgomery County. Before the 113th Congress, the district did not contain Lower Merion Township but instead contained Cheltenham Township.

The Supreme Court of Pennsylvania redrew the district in February 2018 after ruling the previous map unconstitutional due to partisan gerrymandering. The new second district is essentially the successor to the previous first district. As such, it remained heavily Democratic for the 2018 election and representation thereafter. Brendan Boyle, the incumbent from the previous 13th district, ran for re-election in the new 2nd district. Parts of the previous second district were shifted to the third.

Congressman Chaka Fattah represented the district from 1995 to 2016. On July 29, 2015, Fattah and a group of associates were indicted on federal charges related to their alleged roles in a racketeering and influence peddling conspiracy. On April 26, 2016, Dwight Evans toppled Fattah in a competitive Democratic primary election.  Fattah resigned June 23, 2016. Evans then won a special election to fill Fattah's seat.  He also won election for the regular term beginning January 3, 2017. Evans won re-election in the new 3rd congressional district.

List of members representing the district 

The district was organized from Pennsylvania's At-large congressional district in 1791.

1791–1793: One seat

1795–1843: multiple seats 

Two additional seats were added in 1803. The third seat was eliminated in 1813, and the second seat eliminated in 1823. In 1833, the second seat was restored. In 1843, it returned to being a single-member district.

1843–present: One seat

Recent elections

2012

2014

2016

2018

2020

2022

Historical district boundaries

See also

List of United States congressional districts
Pennsylvania's congressional districts

References

 Congressional Biographical Directory of the United States 1774–present

External links
District map, via nationalatlas.gov
Census Bureau profile
Congressional redistricting in Pennsylvania

02
Constituencies established in 1791
1791 establishments in Pennsylvania
Constituencies disestablished in 1793
1793 disestablishments in Pennsylvania
Constituencies established in 1795
1795 establishments in Pennsylvania